This is a list of kings and queens regnant of the kingdoms of Georgia before Russian annexation in 1801–1810.

For more comprehensive lists, and family trees, of Georgian monarchs and rulers see Lists of Georgian monarchs.

Kings of Iberia

Presiding princes of Iberia

Georgia under Bagrationi dynasty

Many members of the Bagrationi dynasty were forced to flee the country and live in exile after the Red Army took control of the short-lived Democratic Republic of Georgia in 1921 and installed the Georgian Communist Party. Since Georgia regained independence in 1990 the dynasty have raised their profile, and in 2008 the two rival branches were united in marriage.

Timeline of Georgian monarchs

See also 

 History of Georgia (country)
 Monarchism in Georgia

Notes 

monarchs
Georgia